Ryan Nicholas Dodson (born October 14, 1992) is an American professional soccer player.

Career

Youth and Club
Dodson played one year of college soccer at the University of North Carolina at Chapel Hill in 2011, before transferring to University of Denver the following year.

Out of college, Dodson went unrated in the 2015 MLS SuperDraft, later signing with Swedish side IFK Stockaryd/IF Rörviks.

After a year in Sweden, Dodson signed with United Soccer League side Pittsburgh Riverhounds on February 11, 2016. He was released by Pittsburgh four months later. His lone appearance came on May 14, 2016 where he came on as a sub and played 18 minutes vs. FC Cincinnati.

Personal life 
Two of Dodson's siblings are also soccer players. His brother, Derek, played for the Georgetown Hoyas (2011) and, as of the 2023 USL Championship season, plays professionally with Charleston Battery. His sister, Kristen, played for the Auburn Tigers (2014–17).

References

External links
Riverhounds player profile

1992 births
Living people
American expatriate soccer players
American soccer players
Association football defenders
North Carolina Tar Heels men's soccer players
Denver Pioneers men's soccer players
People from Libertyville, Illinois
Pittsburgh Riverhounds SC players
Soccer players from Illinois
USL Championship players
American expatriate sportspeople in Sweden
Expatriate footballers in Sweden